Premio de Traducción Literaria Tomás Segovia is a Mexican literary award given to translators. The honorarium includes a cash prize of  making it one of the richest literary prizes in the world. It alternates every year between translators who translate into Spanish, and those translating from Spanish. It is named in honor of Spanish-born Mexican author, translator and poet Tomas Segovia (1927–2011). The award was established in 2012 by the National Council for Culture and Arts (Conaculta), a Mexican government agency responsible for promoting the arts. It is financed by Conaculta in partnership with Fondo de Cultura Economica (Mexico's leading publisher) and the Guadalajara International Book Fair, where the award will be presented.

References

External links
Premio de Traducción Literaria Tomás Segovia, official website 

Translation awards
Awards established in 2012
2012 establishments in Mexico
Mexican literary awards
Spanish-language literary awards